There are many historic trails and roads in the United States which were important to the settlement and development of the United States including those used by American Indians.

The lists below include only those routes in use prior to the creation of the American Highway System in 1926. Many more local routes are discussed at entries for the relevant town.

Settlement routes
 Albany Post Road, in use by 1642, from Bowling Green (New York City) to Albany, called "Broadway" for long stretches
 Bozeman Trail from Virginia City, Montana, to central Wyoming
 California Road established 1849, from Fort Smith, Arkansas, to California
 California Trail from Missouri to California.
 Carolina Road from Roanoke, Virginia, on the Great Wagon Road through the Piedmont to Augusta, Georgia.
 Cherokee Trail along the Arkansas River from Indian Territory to Wyoming.
 Coushatta-Nacogdoches Trace (or Natchitoches)
 El Camino Real (California)
 El Camino Real de Tierra Adentro
 El Camino Viejo 
 Farm Highway completed 1696, from Boston Post Road Stratford, Connecticut, to Nichols, Connecticut.
 Federal Road (Cherokee lands) from Athens, Georgia to Chattanooga and Knoxville, Tennessee
 Federal Road (Creek lands) from Fort Wilkinson (close to Milledgeville, Georgia, to Fort Stoddert (close to Mobile, Alabama)
 Forbes Road established 1759, from Fort Pitt, Pennsylvania to Fort Bedford, Pennsylvania
 Gaines Trace in the Mississippi Territory from near Muscle Shoals on the Tennessee River to Cotton Gin Port on the upper Tombigbee River and on to Fort Stoddert on the lower Tombigbee
 Great Wagon Road (Pennsylvania Wagon Road) from Pennsylvania to Georgia
 Jackson's Military Road from Nashville to New Orleans
 Memphis to Little Rock Road
 Mormon Trail
 Mullan Road from Fort Benton, Montana, to Walla Walla, Washington
 Natchez Trace
 National Road (Cumberland Road)
 Oregon Trail
 Old Spanish Trail from Santa Fe, New Mexico, to southern California
 Old Wire Road, from St. Louis, Missouri, to Fort Smith, Arkansas
 Ozark Trail
 San Antonio-El Paso Road
 Santa Fe Trail
 Siskiyou Trail
 Southern Emigrant Trail
 Southwest Trail, from St. Louis, Missouri, to Texarkana, Texas
 Stockton - Los Angeles Road
 Territorial Road of Michigan, from Detroit west to St. Joseph and Lake Michigan
 Wilderness Road (Wilderness Trail) scouted by Daniel Boone from the Shenandoah Valley through the Cumberland Gap to the Ohio River

Indian routes
 Catawba Path
 Coushatta Trace
 Coushatta-Nacogdoches Trace
 Great Warrior Road
 Natchitoches Trace, from Missouri River's mouth to Natchitoches, Louisiana
 Nemacolin's Path
 St. Joseph Indian Trail, Michigan
 Tuscarora Path
Kittanning Path from Frankstown, Pennsylvania, through the Alleghenys to Kittanning, Pennsylvania
Vincennes Trace

Mail and passenger routes
 Boston Post Road or King's Highway First ride to lay out Post Road January 1, 1673.
San Antonio-San Diego Mail Line (1857–1861) San Antonio, Texas to San Diego, California
 Butterfield Overland Stage Route (1858–1861) St. Louis, Missouri, to San Francisco, California
 Pony Express Route (1860–1862) Saint Joseph, Missouri, to Sacramento, California
 Central Overland Route (1861–1869)

Gaps and passes
 Apache Pass
 Cumberland Gap
 Cooke's Pass, Massacre Canyon
 Dead Mans Pass
 Delaware Water Gap
 Donner Pass
 Glorieta Pass
 King's Highway (Charleston to Boston)
 Kittanning Gap
 Lemhi Pass
 Lolo Pass
 Monida Pass
 Raton Pass
 South Pass
 Warner Pass

Cattle trails
 Abilene Trail
 Chisholm Trail
 Goodnight-Loving Trail
 Texas Road (Shawnee Trail)

Early motor routes
The Good Roads Movement established in May 1860 agitated for better roads for bicyclists. At the turn of the 20th century, interest in the bicycle began to wane in the face of increasing interest in automobiles. In 1913 the Lincoln Highway Association was formed to plan and promote and sign a highway suitable for automobiles using existing roads from Times Square in New York City to San Francisco, California. This was a success and was followed by the development of named auto trails throughout North America. Most of these were subsequently converted to  numbered highways.

See also 
 National Historic Trail
 Route 66
 Potawatomi Trail of Death
 State wildlife trails (United States)
 Trail of Tears
 Turnpike

Notes

External links
 Migration Routes, Roads & Trails, Cyndi's List
 Trading Path Association
 The Wilderness Road